This is a list of East, South, and Southeast Asian capitals.

East Asia

South Asia

Southeast Asia

East, South, and Southeast Asia
 
Capitals
Geography of South Asia
National capitals